An imprint of a publisher is a trade name under which it publishes a work. A single publishing company may have multiple imprints, often using the different names as brands to market works to various demographic consumer segments.

Description 
An imprint of a publisher is a trade name—a name that a business uses for trading commercial products or services—under which a work is published. Imprints typically have a defining character or mission. In some cases, the diversity results from the takeover of smaller publishers (or parts of their business) by a larger company. In the case of Barnes & Noble, imprints have been used to facilitate the venture of a bookseller into publishing.

In the video game industry, some game companies operate various publishing labels with Take-Two Interactive credited as "the father of label" in their case the labels are wholly owned incorporated entities with their own publishing and distributing, sales and marketing infrastructure and management teams and their own respective subsidiaries also incorporated (Rockstar North Limited, 2K Vegas, Inc.). This model has influenced rivals including Activision Blizzard, ZeniMax, Electronic Arts from 2008–2018, Warner Bros. Interactive, Embracer Group, and Koei Tecmo. Take-Two have had such models in place since 1997–1998, and is seen as "a game holding company with autonomous game publishing and development subsidiaries".
Independently-owned game publishers like Devolver Digital also use the word label to describe itself.

Use 
A single publishing company may have multiple imprints, with the different imprints often used by the publisher to market works to different demographic consumer segments. For example, the objective of Viking—an imprint of the Penguin Group—is "[t]o publish a strictly limited list of good nonfiction, such as biography, history and works on contemporary affairs, and distinguished fiction with some claim to permanent importance rather than ephemeral popular interest."

References 

Publishing